Emiliano Purita (born 25 March 1997) is an Argentine professional footballer who plays as a right-back.

Career

Club
Purita began his senior career in 2016 with Argentine Primera División side San Lorenzo, appearing on the substitutes bench for a match against Newell's Old Boys on 30 October. In August 2017, Purita joined fellow top-flight club Arsenal de Sarandí on loan. He made his debut in a home defeat to Temperley. Purita's first career goal arrived on 5 May 2018 during a 4–0 victory over Rosario Central. He spent a second season out on loan in 2018–19, joining newly-promoted San Martín in June 2018. On 6 August 2019 it was confirmed, that Purita had terminated his contract with San Lorenzo and signed permanently with San Martín.

International
Purita represented the Argentina U20s at the 2016 COTIF Tournament in Spain. He played three times, playing against Qatar, Costa Rica and Venezuela. He scored in the match against Costa Rica.

Career statistics
.

References

External links

1997 births
Living people
Footballers from Buenos Aires
Argentine footballers
Argentina youth international footballers
Argentina under-20 international footballers
Association football defenders
Argentine Primera División players
San Lorenzo de Almagro footballers
Arsenal de Sarandí footballers
San Martín de Tucumán footballers
SC Dnipro-1 players
Argentine expatriate footballers
Expatriate footballers in Greece
Argentine expatriate sportspeople in Greece
Expatriate footballers in Ukraine
Argentine expatriate sportspeople in Ukraine